General Duke (born 1865) was an American Thoroughbred racehorse who won the second running of the Belmont Stakes in 1868. A son of Lexington, he was bred by Robert A. Alexander in Kentucky. He raced as a two-year-old, winning twice, including a stakes race. As a three-year-old, he raced nine times, winning six races, including several stakes. His final racing record was 18 wins from 32 starts. He was later known as Judge Curtis, and after his racing career ended he was a breeding stallion in Canada before dying in Illinois in 1888. Three of his daughters won stakes races.

Early life

General Duke was sired by Lexington, and out of Lilla, who was by the imported stallion Yorkshire. General Duke was foaled in 1865 and was a chestnut stallion. He was bred by Robert A. Alexander at Woodburn Stud in Kentucky. Both of his back legs were white to the pastern.

Racing career

General Duke's first start on the racetrack was in 1867, in the Saratoga Stakes on August 9. He carried  and raced for McConnell and Harness. He then raced on August 12, for the same owners at the same distance in a race for two-year-olds, which he won in 1 minute 20 seconds. Both of these races were at Saratoga Race Course in New York. On September 26, 1867, General Duke started a race at Cincinnati, Ohio, the Cincinnati Stakes. This was a  race for two-year-olds, which General Duke won in 1 minute 45 seconds carrying . He was at that time still owned by McConnell and Harness.

As a three-year-old, General Duke first started at the Secaucus Racetrack in New Jersey, on May 29, 1868. This race was a mile-heat race, run as three separate  races. Racing again for McConnell and Harness, General Duke finished 3rd in each of the three heats. The next race he started was the Belmont Stakes on June 10, 1868, which was run at the Jerome Park Racetrack. General Duke won while carrying , in a time of 3 minutes and 2 seconds. His jockey for the race was R. Swim. and the trainer was A. Thompson. The horse led from the start, even though he had reared up with his jockey before the beginning of the race. He was the first of four winners of the Belmont sired by Lexington.

On June 17, General Duke came in second in a sweepstakes race at  distance. He carried  in that race. On August 25, 1868, he won the Providence Stake at Narragansett Race Track, in Rhode Island. The same day, he won a heat race, with two  heats, placing first in both heats. He placed second while carrying . His last start of the year was on October 8, when he won a  race with a time of 3 minutes and 13 seconds.

General Duke's final racing career totals were 32 starts and 18 wins, with total earnings on the track of $17,915. His career spanned six years on the track. He was named Champion Three-Year-Old in 1868. In 1870 he was the first horse to run a mile in 1 minute, 4.5 seconds. When he was four and five, he was owned by Charles Littlefield, but was subsequently sold to Joseph O'Donnell. O'Donnell changed the horse's name, to Judge Curtis; something that has never happened to any other winner of a United States Triple Crown race.

As Judge Curtis, he was used as a breeding stallion in Canada but died in 1888 in Monmouth, Illinois. Three of his daughters won stakes races: His daughter Bonnie Bird, foaled in 1876, won the Queen's Plate at Woodbine Racetrack in 1880. Her full sister Bonnie Duke, foaled in 1882, won the same race in 1887. His 1882 daughter Curtolima won the 1885 Woodstock Plate Handicap, now called the Woodstock Stakes.

Pedigree

Citations

References

 
 
 
 
 
 
 
 
 
 
 

1865 racehorse births
Racehorses trained in the United States
Racehorses bred in Kentucky
Belmont Stakes winners
Thoroughbred family 9-c
Byerley Turk sire line